Sandra Gómez Cantero (born  in Madrid, Spain), is a Spanish Women's International motorcycle trials rider. Gomez has twice been Spanish Women's Trials Champion and a member of the Spanish Trial Des Nations winning team on five occasions, including 2017.

Biography
Gomez first competed in Spanish National series in 2003, finishing in 4th position. Though quite young and competing against more experienced riders she put in consistent performances throughout the next several years.

In 2008 Gomez finished 3rd in the Spanish National Women's A class behind reigning Women's World Champion Laia Sanz and Mireia Conde. This earned her a place on the Spanish Trial Des Nations team alongside Sanz and Conde. The event was held in Andorra and the Spanish team came home victorious.

2009 was a carbon copy of the previous season, ending with the same 1-2-3 in the Spanish Series. Gomez had secured herself what was to be a regular place on the TDN team though this year they were bested by the British team.

A third and two second places saw Gomez step up to second place in the 2010 Spanish series, once again behind Sanz. She also added her second TDN title as the familiar team of Sanz, Gomez and Conde won the event, this year held in Poland.

2011 was to be an excellent year, as Gomez won all three national events to become Spanish Champion for the first time, then the team headed off to Italy and repeated their TDN victory once more.

Mireia Conde held off Gomez in 2012, by a mere 4 points, but they still shared the silverware, along with Sanz, winning the TDN Women's title for the third year running in Switzerland. Gomez also featured prominently in the FIM World Women's Trials Championship throughout the year, taking runner-up places in Andorra and Switzerland and ending the season in third place.

After signing a deal with the Ossa factory in 2013, Gomez was second in the Spanish series behind Conde, this time by 6 points, but she made no mistake in 2014 taking the wins in all three rounds to regain her Spanish Women's title. She also placed third in the FIM World Championships after being on the podium for three out of the four rounds.

In 2015 Gomez slipped back to 8th in the World standings.

Moving up another step, Gomez ended the 2016 season as the second highest ranked female trials rider in the world, finishing runner-up to Emma Bristow in the FIM World Trials Championship. A feat she repeated in 2017, along with adding another TDN title to her list after the Spanish team stopped the British from taking a fifth straight TDN victory.

Starting out 2018 with a strong 2nd place in the opening FIM World Women's Championship round held in Japan, Gomez continued to put in good placings including a podium in France, and ended the season with second place in the Championship behind Bristow.

Spanish Women's Trials Championship

Women's European Trials Championship

Women's World Trials Championship

Honors
 Spanish Women's Trials Champion 2011, 2014
 Women's TDN Winning Team Member 2008, 2010, 2011, 2012, 2017, 2019, 2021

Related Reading
FIM Trial European Championship
FIM Trial World Championship

References 

1993 births
Living people
Spanish motorcycle racers
Motorcycle trials riders